Ghosts is an American television sitcom adapted to American television for CBS by Joe Port and Joe Wiseman from the British series of the same name. Port & Wiseman serve as showrunners.  The American series premiered on October 7, 2021. In October 2021, the series was picked up for a full season. In January 2022, the series was renewed for a second season which premiered on September 29, 2022. In January 2023, the series was renewed for a third season.

Premise 
Married New Yorkers Samantha and Jay Arondekar believe that their dreams have come true when they inherit a beautiful country house from Sophie Woodstone, a distant relative of Sam's, only to find that it is falling apart and inhabited by ghosts who died on the mansion's grounds and are now bound to the area until they can reach the afterlife. Jay cannot see or hear the ghosts, but Sam can after a near-death experience.

Cast

Main

Living 
 Rose McIver as Samantha “Sam” Arondekar, a freelance journalist who, after an accident that leaves her dead for three minutes, revives with the ability to see and hear ghosts wherever she goes. She is based on Alison Cooper from the original British series.
 Utkarsh Ambudkar as Jay Arondekar, Samantha's husband and a chef with many typically "nerdy" interests such as comic books, films, video games, and Dungeons & Dragons. He is based on Mike Cooper from the original British series.

Ghosts 
 Brandon Scott Jones as Captain Isaac Higgintoot, an initially closeted gay American Revolution officer who died of dysentery two weeks after the siege of Fort Ticonderoga and has been largely forgotten by history, making him immensely jealous of the more famous Alexander Hamilton. The living can smell a foul odor if he passes through them, and he begins a relationship with a British officer living in a shed on the property at the end of the first season. He is based mainly on the Captain in the original British series, while his ghost power is similar to that of Mary the witch trial victim.
 Danielle Pinnock as Alberta Haynes, a flamboyant Prohibition-era Lounge singer who was murdered by drinking poisoned moonshine. Her humming can be heard by the living. She can also be heard by Alexa devices.
 Richie Moriarty as Pete Martino, a cheerful, friendly, and polite but socially awkward travel agent, improv enthusiast, enjoyer of basketball, Dungeons and Dragons, and Stars Wars, and Pinecone Trooper leader of Italian descent who died in 1985 when one of his scouts accidentally shot him through the neck with an arrow. He has an unrequited romantic interest in Alberta, and Jay considers him his best friend despite being unable to perceive his presence. He is based on Pat Butcher in the original British series.
 Asher Grodman as Trevor Lefkowitz, the most recently deceased of the ghosts, a wealthy, hard-partying business executive and Wall Street investor of Jewish ancestry who died in 2000 from a heart attack, caused by an accidental drug overdose, while not wearing pants. He can physically interact with the corporeal world to a limited degree if he concentrates hard enough. He is based on Julian Fawcett MP in the original British series. 
 Sheila Carrasco as Susan Montero/"Flower", a cheerful and sweet but naive and forgetful hippie who lived in both a commune and a cult in the 1960s. She was mauled to death by a bear she tried to hug while under the influence of drugs. She can put a living person into a hallucinogenic high if she passes through them and likes being part of throuples.
 Devan Chandler Long as Thorfinn/"Thor", an aggressive, often overly dramatic Viking and the oldest of the ghosts, who set out on an expedition to North America over 1,000 years ago but was abandoned by his shipmates and died from a lightning strike. He has the ability to manipulate electricity and enjoys combat, especially against Danes; watching TV; and talking about his favorite foods, particularly cod. He has a son named Bjorn, now a ghost on an adjacent property, who married a Danish woman. He is based on Robin the caveman in the original British series.
 Rebecca Wisocky as Hetty Woodstone, the uptight lady of the manor, Sam's great-great-great-great-aunt, and wife of the original owner of the Woodstone country estate. She takes pride in being wealthy and looks down her nose on the working class and anyone Irish. Her husband cheated on her in life with many different women. She is based on Lady Fanny Button in the original British series.
 Román Zaragoza as Sasappis/"Sas", a cynical Lenape Native American, who often serves as the voice of reason for the other ghosts. He enjoys storytelling, stirring up drama, watching TV, and smelling all sorts of food, especially pizza, prepared by the living.

Recurring

Ghosts 
 Matt Keyes as the headless body of Crash, a 1950s-era greaser ghost who was decapitated. The character has so far only appeared in "Pilot", "Halloween", and "Trevor's Pants", but CBS has suggested he may return in future episodes. He is based on Sir Humphrey Bone in the British version; however, unlike Humphrey, whose head is always present in each appearance, Crash's head (played by Hudson Thames) has only been seen in some early promotions for the series.
 The cholera victim ghosts: an indeterminate number of ghosts who died during a 19th-century cholera outbreak. Although they can go upstairs if they wish, their sickly appearances disturb the upstairs ghosts, so they spend  all their time in the basement and are experts on the house's heating system. They are based on the Plague ghosts in the British version.
Betsy Sodaro as Cholera Victim Nancy who becomes Pete's fake girlfriend and lives upstairs briefly.
Stuart Fink as Cholera Victim Stuart
Arthur Holden as Cholera Victim Creepy Dirk. When the ghosts decide to elect a representative to petition Sam rather than make requests individually, Creepy Dirk wins after Isaac's attempt to garner their support for his candidacy. He briefly holds the position after Sam rejects the arrangement.
Cody Crain as Cholera Victim Cody
Nigel Downer as Cholera Victim Nigel
Cat Lemieux as Cholera Victim Catherine
 The British Revolutionary ghosts: three ghosts who died in the Revolutionary War and occupy the shed on the property that used to be a barracks, as was agreed upon with Isaac after the war ended. They keep mostly to themselves and come up to the main house to redraw the border lines every few years.
 John Hartman as Nigel Chessum, the leader of the trio, whom Isaac accidentally shot. They have had secret romantic feelings for one another since they were alive, and they begin a relationship at the end of the first season.
 Chad Andrews as Baxter, Nigel's subordinate who plays a fife.
 Christian Daoust as Jenkins, Nigel's subordinate who possesses a musket. He and Nigel had a physical relationship before Nigel and Isaac started dating (and "liasoned" once more while Isaac and Nigel were "on a respite".)
 Crystle Lightning as Shiki, a Lenape woman on whom Sasappis had a crush in life. As a ghost, she is bound to the land occupied by a local magazine's publishing office, so Sam and Jay help her establish a long-distance relationship with Sas.
 Lindsey Broad as Judy, Henry Farnsby's deceased mother, who now haunts their home.
 Christian Jadah as Bjorn, Thorfinn's son, who married a Danish woman and had three children, travelled to find his father, and now haunts the Farnsbys' property, having died at about the same age as Thor. Sam helps him reconnect with his father by having them shout to each other through the windows.
 Nichole Sakura as Jessica, a permanently drunk ghost who died in a car crash while driving under the influence of alcohol and is now bound to a small perimeter around her former car, enabling her to travel more freely than other ghosts can.

Living
 Tristan D. Lalla as Mark, a construction worker involved in renovating Woodstone Manor for Sam and Jay.
 Rodrigo Fernandez-Stoll as Todd Pearlman, an obsessive fan of Alberta's who operates a "museum" dedicated to her out of his mother's garage.
 Punam Patel as Bela, Jay's sister who gets catfished by Trevor. Sam tells her the truth about her talking to ghosts, and while Bela is at first skeptical, Sam is able to convince her with the help of the ghosts. She later returns in "The Christmas Spirit", trying to get Trevor to possess her friend Eric. 
 Mark Linn-Baker and Kathryn Greenwood as Henry and Margaret Farnsby, Sam and Jay's neighbors who promise to support their permit applications for their renovations. It is later revealed that they are swingers. They are based on the neighbour's Barclay Beg-Chetwynde and his wife Bunny in the British version.
 Punkie Johnson and Carolyn Taylor as June and Ally, Sam and Jay's neighbors who run an organic farm called "Cover Crop Farms".
 Mike Lane as Freddy, a deliveryman hired as an assistant at the Arondekars' B&B.

Guests
Caroline Aaron as Carol, Pete's wife who cheated on him when he was alive.
Tara Spencer-Nairn as Young Carol
 Rachael Harris as Sheryl, Sam's mother, who she sees as a ghost at the restaurant where she died. After she and Sam make peace with each other, she moves on to the afterlife.
 Matt Walsh as Elias Woodstone, Hetty's husband, who was trapped in a ghost proof vault. He has the power to make people sexually aroused when he walks through them. After he rants about becoming a permanent nuisance and refusing to change himself, he is seemingly sent to Hell.
 Gregory Zaragoza as Naxasi, Sass's father, who tried to convince him not to be a storyteller.
 Odessa A'zion as Stephanie, a teenage ghost who was murdered on her prom night by a chainsaw killer in 1987. She sleeps in the attic for months at a time, as extended sleep periods are common for ghosts who die in their teens, and wakes up around the day of her prom night each year.
 Drew Tarver as Micah, a charismatic cult leader who attempts to manipulate Jay into joining his group so they can move into the mansion.
 Hannah Rose May as Molly, an Irish maid with whom Elias had an affair when they were alive. She is brought back from the afterlife briefly through a seance.
 Dallas Goldtooth as Bob, a Lenape man from the Hudson Valley Lenape Culture Center. He corrects the information Sass has given the group about the ancient tree on their land and teaches them about land acknowledgements, and Sass admires his work.
 Kelly Craig as Olga, Thorfinn's wife and Bjorn's mother.
 Mathew Baynton as an actor starring in a reconstruction of Pete's death.
 Rose Abdoo as Paula, the producer of "Dumb Deaths".
 Dana Gourrier as Jennifer, a woman who was one of Pete's scout troops that witnessed his death.
 Kaliko Kauahi as a liquor license inspector.
 Neil Crone as Benjamin Franklin, an American Founding Father and a member of the Freemasons, with whom Isaac tried to build a good reputation so he could join the secret society.
 Andrew Leeds as Eric, Bela's new boyfriend.
 Hillary Anne Matthews as Beatrice, Isaac's wife, who knew about his sexuality but cared deeply for him regardless.
Tara Reid as herself attending Trevor's memorial at Woodstone Manor.

Episodes

Series overview

Season 1 (2021–22)

Season 2 (2022–23)

Production

Development 
On November 29, 2019, CBS announced that they were developing an adaptation of the BBC One series Ghosts. The original British series upon which the series is based was created by Mathew Baynton, Simon Farnaby, Martha Howe-Douglas, Jim Howick, Laurence Rickard, and Ben Willbond for BBC. On February 4, 2020, it was announced that the pilot had been picked up by CBS Studios and was co-produced with BBC Studios and Lionsgate Television. On March 31, 2021, it was announced that the adaptation has been picked up for a full series. In July 2021, it was announced that the series would premiere as a Thursday-night entry on October 7, 2021. On September 23, 2021, CBS changed the premiere to back-to-back episodes. On October 21, 2021, CBS picked up the series for a full season. On December 17, 2021, it was reported that production has been temporarily halted due to a positive case of COVID-19 on the set of the series. On January 24, 2022, CBS renewed the series for a second season which premiered on September 29, 2022. On November 8, 2022, it was announced that the BBC would be airing Ghosts in the United Kingdom under the name of 'Ghosts US' on BBC Three & BBC iPlayer on November 20, 2022. On January 12, 2023, CBS renewed the series for a third season.

Casting 
On March 4, 2020, Rose McIver was cast in a leading role for the pilot. On July 1, 2020, Utkarsh Ambudkar was cast in a main role for the pilot. On December 9, 2020, Brandon Scott Jones, Richie Moriarty, Asher Grodman, Rebecca Wisocky, Sheila Carrasco, Danielle Pinnock and Roman Zaragoza were cast in main roles for the pilot. On May 12, 2021, Devan Chandler Long joined the cast as a series regular.

Reception

Critical response
For the first season, the review aggregator website Rotten Tomatoes reported a 93% approval rating with an average rating of 7.3/10, based on 27 critic reviews. The website's critics consensus reads, "Ghosts could stand to ask more of its characters, but an excellent ensemble and a genial wit make for easy, softly spooky viewing." Metacritic, which uses a weighted average, assigned a score of 69 out of 100 based on 13 critics, indicating "generally favorable reviews".

On Rotten Tomatoes, the second season has received an approval rating of 100% with an average rating of 7/10, based on seven critic reviews.

Ratings

Season 1

Season 2

Accolades 

The first season was recognized with The ReFrame Stamp for hiring people of underrepresented gender identities, and of color.

Notes

References

External links
 
 

2020s American single-camera sitcoms
2020s American supernatural television series
2021 American television series debuts
American television series based on British television series
CBS original programming
English-language television shows
Fiction about near-death experiences
Television series about ghosts
Television series about marriage
Television series by BBC Studios
Television series by CBS Studios
Television series by Lionsgate Television
Television shows about psychic powers
Television shows set in New York City
Works set in country houses